Dimov is a Bulgarian masculine surname, its feminine counterpart is Dimova. It may refer to

Daniel Dimov (born 1989), Bulgarian footballer
Dejan Dimov (born 1974), Macedonian basketball player
Diana Dimova (born 1984), Bulgarian badminton player
Dimitar Dimov (1909–1966), Bulgarian novelist and dramatist
Dimitar Dimov (footballer) (born 1937), Bulgarian footballer
Diyan Dimov (born 1985), Bulgarian footballer
Evgenia Dimova (born 1982) Russian badminton player
Ivan Dimov (1897–1965), Bulgarian actor
Ivan Dimov (scientist), Bulgarian scientist
Leonid Dimov (1926–1987), Romanian poet and translator
Martin Dimov (born 1984), Bulgarian footballer
Martin Dimov (footballer born 1986) (born 1986), Bulgarian footballer
Milena Dimova (born 1994), Bulgarian volleyball player
Oleg Dimov (born 1968), Russian politician
Plamen Dimov (born 1990), Bulgarian footballer
Plamen Dimov (musician) (born 1955), Bulgarian musician 
Stanimir Dimov-Valkov (born 1978), Bulgarian football defender
Theodora Dimova (born 1960), Bulgarian writer and playwright
Valentin Dimov (born 1989), Bulgarian tennis player

See also
Dymov

Bulgarian-language surnames
Macedonian-language surnames